Ptychopseustis calamochroa is a moth in the family Crambidae. It is found in Kenya, Malawi, Mozambique, Nigeria and South Africa.

References

Cybalomiinae
Moths described in 1896
Moths of Sub-Saharan Africa